Ponsorimalai, also known as Sorimalai, is a hill in Vennandur block of Namakkal district in Tamil Nadu, India.

Geology
Ponsorimalai is located northwest of Alavaimalai and southeast of Kanjamalai. North and West side foot hill limits are surrounded by villages of Salem district, South and East side foot hill limits are surrounded by villages of Namakkal district.

History

A 15th-century Jain inscriptions in the hills bear couplet 251 from the “Shunning meat” chapter (Chapter 26) of the Kural text, indicating that the people of the Kongu Nadu region practiced ahimsa and non-killing as chief virtues.

References

Hills of Tamil Nadu